A senatorial election was held on November 9, 1965 in the Philippines. The Nacionalista Party wrestled back control of the Senate; originally a Liberal, Senate President Ferdinand Marcos defected to the Nacionalistas, became their presidential candidate and won this year's election.

After the election, the Senate emerged with 12 Liberals on one side, and 11 Nacionalistas and 1 Nationalist Citizens' Party caucusing with them on the other.

Retiring incumbents

Nacionalista Party
Fernando Lopez (Nacionalista), ran for vice president and won
Ferdinand Marcos (Nacionalista), ran for president and won

Mid-term vacancies 

 Mariano Jesús Cuenco (Nacionalista), died on February 25, 1964
 Eulogio Rodriguez (Nacionalista), died on December 9, 1964

Other incumbents running elsewhere 
These ran in the middle of their Senate terms. For those losing in their respective elections, they can still return to the Senate to serve out their term, while the winners will vacate their Senate seats, then it would have been contested in a special election concurrently with the next general election.

 Gerardo Roxas (Liberal), ran for vice president and lost

Results
The Nacionalista Party won five seats, the Liberal Party won two seats, and the Nationalist Citizens' Party (NCP) won one.

NCP's Lorenzo Tañada, and Nacionalistas Alejandro Almendras and Genaro Magsaysay all defended their seats.

Five winners are neophyte senators. These are Dominador Aytona, Eva Estrada Kalaw, and Wenceslao Lagumbay of the Nacionalistas, and Liberals Sergio Osmeña Jr. and Jovito Salonga.

Estanislao Fernandez of the Liberal Party lost his seat.

Key:
 ‡ Seats up
 + Gained by a party from another party
 √ Held by the incumbent
 * Held by the same party with a new senator
 ^ Vacancy

Per candidate

Per party

See also
Commission on Elections
6th Congress of the Philippines

References

External links
 The Philippine Presidency Project
 Official website of the Commission on Elections

1965
1965 elections in the Philippines